William Smith (December 19, 1865 – January 9, 1936) was an American golfer. He competed in the men's individual event at the 1904 Summer Olympics.

References

External links
 

1865 births
1936 deaths
Amateur golfers
American male golfers
Olympic golfers of the United States
Golfers at the 1904 Summer Olympics
Golfers from Philadelphia